The 1990–91 BCAFL was the sixth full season of the British Collegiate American Football League, organised by the British Students American Football Association.

Changes from last season
Division Changes
The four Conferences was merged into two (Northern & Southern)

Team Changes
Aston University joined the Southern Conference, as the Rhinos
University of Cambridge joined the Southern Conference, as the Pythons
University of Leeds joined the Northern Conference, as the Celtics
Newcastle Scholars changed their name to Newcastle Mariners
Sheffield Pirates changed their name to Sheffield Zulus
This increased the number of teams in BCAFL to 19.

Regular season

Northern Conference

Southern Conference

Playoffs

Note – the table does not indicate who played home or away in each fixture.

References

External links
 Official BUAFL Website
 Official BAFA Website

1990–91
1991 in British sport
1990 in British sport
1991 in American football
1990 in American football